Paracymoriza cataclystalis is a moth of the family Crambidae described by Embrik Strand in 1919. It is found in Taiwan.

The wingspan is 16–20 mm.

References

Moths described in 1919
Acentropinae